These are the results of the 2003 IAAF World Athletics Final, which took place in at the Stade Louis II in Monte Carlo, Monaco on 13–14 September. The hammer throw events were staged separately on 7 September in Szombathely, Hungary, due to stadium limitations in Monaco.

The competition replaced the IAAF Grand Prix Final, which had a varying set of events each year, with a full set programme of 33 track and field events. The year's top seven athletes, based on their IAAF World Rankings, qualified to compete in each event, with an extra four athletes selected for races of 1500 metres and above. One additional athlete, a wildcard, was allocated to each event by the IAAF and replacement athletes were admitted to replace the qualified athletes that could not attend the final.

Two national records were set at the competition, both in the long jump. Many of the events were affected by the presence of athletes involved in the BALCO scandal, with Dwain Chambers, Zhanna Block, Kelli White, Ramon Clay, Duane Ross, Kevin Toth and Jerome Young all being subsequently disqualified for doping. Young had won the men's 400 metres and White was the women's 200 metres winner.

Track
Key

100 metres

200 metres

400 metres

800 metres

1500 metres

3000 metres

5000 metres

110/100 metres hurdles

400 metres hurdles

3000 metres steeplechase

Field

High jump

Pole vault

Long jump

Triple jump

Shot put

Discus throw

Hammer throw

Javelin throw

References

Results
2003 IAAF World Athletics Final results. IAAF. Retrieved 2018-04-24.
1st IAAF World Athletics Final. IAAF. Retrieved 2018-04-24.

World Athletics Final results
Events at the IAAF World Athletics Final